Leucoptera euryphaea is a moth in the family Lyonetiidae. It is known from Australia.

They probably mine the leaves of their host plant.

External links
Australian Faunal Directory

Leucoptera (moth)
Moths of Australia
Moths described in 1926